Anthony Cetinski (born 31 May 1969), known professionally as Tony Cetinski, is a Croatian pop singer. Today, he is one of the most popular male singers in Croatia and countries of former Yugoslavia.

Biography
Born into a family of musicians in Pula (then SR Croatia, SFR Yugoslavia), Cetinski began singing when he was 15 years old with various local groups. He moved from Rovinj to Zagreb in 1991 to start his career, and quickly became one of Croatia's leading pop stars. In 1994 he represented Croatia at the Eurovision Song Contest with the song "Nek' ti bude ljubav sva". In 2003 Tony released his eighth studio album "A sada" with 14 tracks: "Blago onom tko te ima", "Moje sve", "Ostani zauvijek", "Sve bih opet", "Rijeka ljubavi", "Daj mi sve", "Zauvijek", "Nebo iznad nas", "Zvijezda", "Sve svoje snove", "Iz dana u dan", "Ti", "Reci da li znaš" and "O sole mio".

At the 10th Croatian Radio Festival in 2006, Cetinski won all three prizes in pop-rock category: HRF Grand Prix – pop-rock, Listener's award and Music Editors award. He also recorded the song "Lagala nas mala" as a duet with the late Toše Proeski. This song appears on both of Toše Proeski's 2005 albums Po tebe and the Croatian edition Pratim te. The song was also done as a remix by DeeJay Time.

In 2009 Cetinski won the Porin award for best male vocal performance with his song "Ako to se zove ljubav". Cetinski sold out two concerts in Arena Zagreb the same year with more than 30,000 people attending.

In December 2020, Cetinski was announced as one of the 14 finalists for Dora 2021, the national contest in Croatia to select the country's Eurovision Song Contest 2021 entry. He will perform the song "Zapjevaj, sloboda je!" in a duet with Kristijan Rahimovski which was also written by the later.

Personal life 
Tony is married to Dubravka Cetinski.

He is a devout Roman Catholic.

Discography

 1990 Samo srce ne laže
 1992 Ljubomora I
 1993 Ljubomora II
 1995 Ljubav i bol
 1996 Prah i pepeo
 1998 A1
 2000 Triptonyc
 2003 A sada...
 2005 Budi uz mene
 2008 Ako to se zove ljubav
 2010 Da Capo
 2011 Best of Tony Cetinski
 2012 Opet si pobijedila
 2018 Kao U Snu

Trivia
 Tony Cetinski starred in the RTL Televizija TV show Mjenjačnica (Exchange Office) where he swapped for a day with a stone carver. Tony worked as a stone carver at Donji Humac on Brač Island.

References

External links

 

1969 births
Living people
Eurovision Song Contest entrants for Croatia
21st-century Croatian male singers
Croatian pop singers
Eurovision Song Contest entrants of 1994
People from Pula
Hayat Production artists
20th-century Croatian male singers